Ammajan is a Bengali film music released in 1999. This mother devotional song was used in the 1999 film Ammajan directed by Kazi Hayat. Ayub Bachchu has given voice to this song with lyrics and music by Ahmed Imtiaz Bulbul. Manna has acted and lip-synced in portraying this song in a scene of the film. Through this song, Ayub Bachchu became popular in Bengali films.

Background

Concept
The song is part of a film named Ammajan is directed by Kazi Hayat who never sat down with the composer about the music. He gave complete freedom to the composer in this regard. He believes that giving freedom to composers will bring good things. The director asked Bulbul to write and compose a song about mothers for the film that no other mother-related song could compare to. Hayat told Bulbul the plot of the film in detail where the mother devotee hero would do anything for her. Taking everything into consideration, Bulbul wrote and composed the song.

Inspiration
Bulbul wanted to write the song in such a way that the lyrics would have depth. In the lyrics of the song he adds several religious words which he has to add very carefully and impartially. He made the song so that all kinds of people can understand and sing it.

Artist
Bulbul wanted to sing the song to Ayub Bachchu, whom he had known since childhood. He usually does not sing for films. Bachchu initially refused to sing the song and had to be persuaded with great difficulty. While recording the song, Ayub Bachchu did not have to use any instruments or software to sing.

Production
Ahmed Imtiaz Bulbul composed and wrote the lyrics of this song. The song was sang by Ayub Bachchu, while Ayub Bachchu's singing and singing style were preferred in the lyrics.

Release and influence on popular culture
After the release of the film, the song was well received by the audience and became a huge hit and the song became a household name. This song is regularly aired in Bangladesh Betar's film music program. Nineteen years after the release of the film, the music video of the song was released on YouTube on June 25, 2018, under the banner of Anupam Recording Media.

Achievement

References

External links 

 Article about the song on bmdb.co

1999 songs
Bangladeshi film songs
Bengali-language songs
Songs about mothers
Songs written by Ahmed Imtiaz Bulbul
Ayub Bachchu songs